Jack Sherman (23 September 1900 – 14 October 1969) was an Australian rules footballer who played with Footscray in the Victorian Football League (VFL) and represented Footscray in its first official VFL match in 1925.

After his one and only season with Footscray, Sherman went on to play with the Preston, Maffra, Traralgon (1930 - losing grand final side) and Stratford Football Clubs and represented the Gippsland League against The Wimmera.

Jack is the brother of Ted Sherman and Bill Sherman.

Notes

External links 

1930 - Traralgon FC & Sale FC team photos

1900 births
1969 deaths
Australian rules footballers from Victoria (Australia)
Western Bulldogs players